The 1959 United States Senate elections in Hawaii were held July 28, 1959. Following the admission of Hawaii as the fiftieth State in the union, the state held two simultaneous elections to determine their first senators.

The elections were split between the Republican and Democratic parties. The new senators took office August 21. Oren E. Long was given seniority based on his service as Governor of Hawaii. Hiram Fong became the first Asian American U.S. senator and the first person to be born outside of the contiguous United States.

Class 1

This election was for the class 1 term expiring in 1965. It was won by Republican Hiram Fong.

General election

Candidates
Frank Fasi, Territorial Senator	 (Democratic)
Hiram Fong, former member of the Territorial Legislature (Republican)

Results

Class 3

This election was for the Class 3 term expiring in 1963. It was won by Democrat Oren Long, who started an as-of-yet uninterrupted streak of Democratic victories in the Class 3 Senate seat in Hawaii. As of 2022, Tsukiyama's loss by a 2.8 point margin is the closest Republicans have come to winning this seat.

General election

Candidates
Oren Long, former territorial Governor of Hawaii (Democratic)
Eugene Ressencourt (Commonwealth)
Wilfred Tsukiyama, former President of the Territorial Senate (Republican)

Results

Following Long's victory, Governor William F. Quinn appointed Tsukiyama to the Hawaii Supreme Court.

References

1959
Hawaii
United States Senate